DeWitt Menyard (May 24, 1944 – May 21, 2009) was an American professional basketball player.

A 6'10" center from the University of Utah, Menyard played one season (1967–68) in the American Basketball Association (ABA) as a member of the Houston Mavericks. He averaged 9.1 points per game and 7.8 rebounds per game and appeared in the 1968 ABA All-Star Game.

References
 retrieved 29 November 2 

1944 births
2009 deaths
Allan Hancock Bulldogs men's basketball players
American men's basketball players
Basketball players from South Bend, Indiana
Basketball players from Mississippi
Centers (basketball)
Houston Mavericks players
People from Columbus, Mississippi
Utah Utes men's basketball players